Marques Keith Brownlee (born December 3, 1993), also known professionally as MKBHD, is an American YouTuber and professional ultimate Frisbee player, best known for his technology-focused videos as well as his podcast Waveform. , he has over 16 million subscribers and over 3 billion total video views. Vic Gundotra, a former senior vice president of Google, called Brownlee "the best technology reviewer on the planet right now". The former name of his YouTube channel is a concatenation of MKB (Brownlee's initials) and HD (for high definition). With New York PoNY, he is the 2022 WFDF World Champion in the Open Category for ultimate Frisbee.

Career 

Brownlee joined YouTube on March 21, 2008. He first started uploading technology videos in January 2009, while still in high school, about new products or reviews of products he already owned. He produced his first videos through screencasting. His first several hundred videos were primarily hardware tutorials and freeware. As of July 2022, his channel has gained over 10 million subscribers, making MKBHD one of the most-subscribed-to technology-focused YouTube channels, according to Social Blade. Brownlee uploaded his 1000th video on March 29, 2018.

Brownlee's reviews have been promoted by other review sites as well. Engadget promoted the site in January 2012 when they featured his tour of the then-new cloud storage service called Insync. In November 2013, one of Brownlee's most viral videos was posted based on the LG G Flex, where he performed various scratch tests to portray the self-healing ability of the device. The video reached one million views on the first day. , the video has almost 8 million views. In December 2013, Brownlee did an interview with Motorola CEO Dennis Woodside. In May 2014, Brownlee did the first over-the-air interview with Evan Blass.

Brownlee's video review and scratch test of a rumored 4.7-inch sapphire display component for the iPhone 6, uploaded July 7, 2014, gained immediate popularity, being featured on sites such as The Verge, Forbes, HuffPost, CNET, and Time Magazine. The video appeared on NBC News, and in newspapers across the world. , the video has gained over 9.2 million views on YouTube and has had over 60,000 likes. Brownlee also has a similar video regarding a dummy model of the iPhone 6, uploaded a couple of months earlier, which  has since gained over 7.6 million views on YouTube.

In December 2015, Brownlee interviewed professional NBA basketball player Kobe Bryant, titled Talking Tech with Kobe Bryant!, in which he talks about tech interests of Kobe and the most recent Kobe-designed Nike shoes, the Kobe 11.

During one of the 2016 Democratic presidential primary debates that was cosponsored by YouTube, Brownlee asked the candidates, by video, whether tech companies and the government can find a middle ground over encryption while considering rights to privacy and national security.

In October 2016, he interviewed Apple's senior vice president of software engineering Craig Federighi during the release of their latest MacBook Pro 2016. The latter was, again, invited to Brownlee's channel after WWDC 2020 in June.

In March 2018, he interviewed Neil deGrasse Tyson. In April 2018, Brownlee won Shorty Awards Creator of the Decade. In June 2018, Brownlee was a guest on Hot Ones. In August 2018, he interviewed Tesla CEO Elon Musk and with assistance of TLD (Jonathan Morrison) filmed Tesla Factory Tour with Elon Musk! In December 2018, Brownlee was featured in YouTube Rewind, later releasing a video on his complaints about the series.

In February 2019, he interviewed Bill Gates. In October 2019, he interviewed Microsoft CEO Satya Nadella before Microsoft's Surface announcement, in addition to actor Will Smith.

Brownlee reached 10 million subscribers on December 18, 2019.

He interviewed Bill Gates again in February 2020. In September 2020, he interviewed Mark Zuckerberg, discussing holograms and the future of virtual reality. In December 2020, he interviewed Barack Obama, discussing use of technology and social media in government. In December 2020, he was honored in the Forbes 30 Under 30 listing in its social media category.

In May 2021, Brownlee interviewed Sundar Pichai, CEO of Google on various subjects such as future technology and AI.

Retro Tech 
Retro Tech is a YouTube Original series produced by Vox Media Studios starring MKBHD which aired on December 2, 2019. In the series, Brownlee interviews fellow YouTube creators and celebrity guests and discusses iconic pieces of technology from the past which have had a major impact on modern life and culture. Season 2 of Retro Tech began in April 2021, in which he reviews technology that was believed to be the future but failed to ever reach production or the general public.

Waveform: The MKBHD Podcast

Brownlee is the host of a technology podcast with co-host Andrew Manganelli, who is a producer for the MKBHD YouTube channel. The podcast is called the Waveform: The MKBHD Podcast and is sometimes referred to as Waveform and WVFRM. The podcast is focused on consumer electronics and surrounding topics. The first episode was aired on July 31, 2019. Brownlee announced the podcast on his YouTube channel on August 13, 2019, in the video titled "Introducing Waveform: The MKBHD Podcast!". There have been multiple high-profile guests on the podcast, including iJustine, Mark Zuckerberg, Craig Federighi, and Carl Pei.

The Studio 
Brownlee is also the host of another YouTube channel called The Studio, which focuses on behind-the-scenes activity of the MKBHD team.

Smartphone Awards 
In December 2014, Brownlee started his Smartphone Awards series, where he picks the best phones in certain categories from the past year. In 2017, Brownlee started to create physical awards that were featured in the video, most of which were requested and sent to the companies whose phones won them. The Smartphone Awards are usually posted towards the middle of December, after all of the phones of the year have been released and tested.

Personal life
Marques Keith Brownlee was born on December 3, 1993. He grew up in Maplewood, New Jersey. He attended Columbia High School, graduating in 2011, and studied at the Howe School at Stevens Institute of Technology, where he majored in business and information technology. Brownlee graduated from college in May 2015 and became a full-time YouTuber. His videos were produced at his apartment until he moved out in 2016, and he now works out of a studio in Kearny, New Jersey, using RED video equipment. He owned a Tesla Model S P100D, which he occasionally featured in his channel until he replaced it in 2020 with the Performance (Raven) Model S, and again in 2021 with the Model S Plaid.

American Ultimate Disc League (AUDL)

Brownlee is a professional ultimate frisbee player for the New York Empire of the American Ultimate Disc League (AUDL), who were the AUDL champions in 2019 and 2022. Brownlee previously played for the Philadelphia Phoenix (2017) and Garden State Ultimate (2015–2017). Other previous team engagements include the now-defunct New Jersey Hammerheads, a team belonging to the AUDL, and the New York Rumble, which was in the now-defunct league Major League Ultimate.

On July 31, 2022, Brownlee won the WFDF World Ultimate Club Championship with New York PoNy.

Notes

References

External links

1993 births
21st-century African-American writers
African-American media personalities
American bloggers
American technology news websites
American YouTubers
Columbia High School (New Jersey) alumni
Living people
People from Kearny, New Jersey
People from Maplewood, New Jersey
Streamy Award winners
Technology YouTubers
Ultimate (sport) players
Video bloggers
Writers from Hoboken, New Jersey
YouTube channels launched in 2008